Mount Olive High School is a high school in Mount Olive, Mississippi. It is a part of the Covington County School District. The principal is Otonya Gray.

Notable alumni
 Steve McNair, NFL quarterback

References

External links
 

Public high schools in Mississippi
Education in Covington County, Mississippi